This is a list of submissions to the 71st Academy Awards for Best Foreign Language Film. The Academy Award for Best Foreign Language Film was created in 1956 by the Academy of Motion Picture Arts and Sciences to honour non-English-speaking films produced outside the United States. The award is handed out annually, and is accepted by the winning film's director, although it is considered an award for the submitting country as a whole. Countries are invited by the Academy to submit their best films for competition according to strict rules, with only one film being accepted from each country.

For the 71st Academy Awards, the Academy invited 73 countries to submit films for the Academy Award for Best Foreign Language Film. The submission deadline was set on November 1, 1998. Forty-five countries submitted films to the Academy. The five nominated films came from Argentina, Brazil, Iran, Spain and the eventual winner, Life Is Beautiful, from Italy. Kyrgyzstan submitted a film for the first time, meanwhile, Lebanon and Morocco both returned to the competition after a 20-year absence.

Submissions

Notes
  Russia's submission, The Barber of Siberia, was withdrawn when a print of the just-finished film was unable to be sent to Los Angeles in time.

References

71